The 2011–12 Dynamo Moscow season was the 89th season in club history. During this long season (transitional from 'spring-autumn' formula to 'autumn-spring'), club participated in three competitions – the Russian Premier League, the 2010–11 Russian Cup and the 2011–12 Russian Cup.

Review and events

During season, two managers worked with first team:
Miodrag Božović worked with team during pre-season and first few matches but was dismissed after Cup exit in home match vs Rostov;
Sergei Silkin who worked earlier with the youth team was appointed as the first team manager after Božović was fired in the end of April 2011 before Matchday 6.

Igor Semshov started season as a captain of Dynamo Moscow. Andriy Voronin was appointed club captain after arrival of Sergei Silkin as a manager. When Voronin was not in starting XI, captain's functions were delegated to Kevin Kurányi or Igor Semshov.

Matches and results

Legend

Russian Premier League

Results by matchday

Matches and tables

First stage

Championship group

Russian Cup 2010–11

Russian Cup 2011–12

Statistics

Appearances and goals

|-
|colspan="14"|Players who left Dynamo during season:

|}

Scorers and assistants

Disciplinary record

Transfers winter 2010–11

In:

Out:

Transfers summer 2011

In:

Out:

Transfers winter 2011–12

In:

Out:

Youth team

The FC Dynamo Moscow youth team participated in Youth Championship (March–November 2011) and Youth Tournament of Championship group (November 2011 – May 2012).

Matches and results

Legend

Results by matchday

Youth Championship 2011

Youth Tournament of Championship group 2012

Youth squad

The following players were registered with the RFPL and listed by club's website as youth players. They were eligible to play for the first team.

References

Dynamo Moscow
FC Dynamo Moscow seasons